This list of Plaid Cymru MSs (Members of the Senedd) includes all members of the Senedd elected under Plaid Cymru.

Notes

References

See also
 List of Plaid Cymru MPs

Plaid Cymru
MSs